Ciara Sheehy (born 12 August 1980, in Dublin) is a retired Irish sprinter who competed primarily in the 200 metres. She represented her country at the 2000 Summer Olympics, as well as one outdoor and two indoor World Championships.

Competition record

Personal bests
Outdoor
100 metres – 11.52 (+1.2 m/s) (Fribourg 2003)
200 metres – 23.21 (+0.9 m/s) (Germiston 2002)
Indoor
60 metres – 7.45 (Belfast 2003)
200 metres – 23.17 (Birmingham 2003) NR

References

1980 births
Living people
Sportspeople from Dublin (city)
Irish female sprinters
Olympic athletes of Ireland
Athletes (track and field) at the 2000 Summer Olympics
World Athletics Championships athletes for Ireland
Olympic female sprinters